The 2008–09 Lebanese Women's Football League was the 2nd edition of the Lebanese Women's Football League since its inception in 2008. Defending champions Sadaka won their second title, with a 2–0 victory over Homenmen in the final matchday of the season.

League table

See also
2008–09 Lebanese Women's FA Cup

References

External links
RSSSF.com

Lebanese Women's Football League seasons
Lebanon
W1